The 2019–20 season is Temperley's 2nd consecutive season in the second division of Argentine football, Primera B Nacional.

The season generally covers the period from 1 July 2019 to 30 June 2020.

Review

Pre-season
Temperley started their pre-season preparations early, participating in their first exhibition match on 15 May 2019 against Primera División side Independiente; which they lost 3–0. Another friendly followed on 28 May, as they met the reserves of Racing Club; drawing the day's secondary encounter 2–2, though they did win the initial fixture thanks to a goal from Enzo Salas. 1 June saw Adrián Arregui agree a temporary departure away, as he headed to Colombia's Independiente Medellín on loan. Three days later, Josué Ayala completed a permanent transfer to Rosario Central; having been on loan in 2018–19. A third outgoing was confirmed on 12 June, as Lucas Mancinelli penned terms with Patronato. Also on that date, Temperley lost one-nil to Gimnasia y Esgrima (LP) Reserves.

Two transactions were announced on 14 June, with Alexis Vega (Brown) becoming Temperley's first signing while Leandro González went to Quilmes. Patricio Romero was loaned to Talleres on 18 June. During the following twenty-four hours, Lucas Baldunciel came from Gimnasia y Esgrima (M). Six incomings arrived across the succeeding ten days, as Cristian Aldirico received: Emanuel Ibáñez (Estudiantes (BA), Federico Crivelli (Boca Unidos), Matías Castro (Unión Santa Fe), Emiliano Ellacopulos (Instituto), Enzo Baglivo (UAI Urquiza) and Gonzalo Asis (Independiente). June concluded with friendlies with Gimnasia y Esgrima (LP)'s first-team, who came away undefeated. Signings nine/ten were revealed as Marcos Martinich and Nicolás Messiniti on 1/2 July.

Temperley faced Independiente for a second/third time in pre-season on 3 July, with the top-flight club getting the better of them again; winning 1–0 and 3–0. Days later saw Temperley play Aldosivi in non-competitive action, with both encounters ending in four-goal draws; sixteen-year-old Franco Ayunta netted in the opening game. Friendlies with Sportivo Italiano were staged on 10 July, with El Gasolero netting six goals across two wins. On that same day, Darío Salina headed off to San Telmo. The following week saw Julián Lucero, Brian Puntano, Pablo Magnín and Lucas Wilchez depart to Juventud Unida Universitario, Sportivo Las Parejas, Sarmiento and Almagro respectively. During which time, Fernando Alarcón and Mauro González signed with Temperley.

The club fought Comunicaciones in an exhibition match on 17 July; not long after a fixture with Estudiantes (LP) had been cancelled due to bad weather. Friendly outing number fifteen saw an encounter with Banfield Reserves set, with Temperley losing despite a goal from Emiliano Ellacopulos. Their next friendly brought a further match-up with Independiente, as they ended their losing streak versus El Rojo with a low-scoring tie. On 23 July, Federico Mazur joined Gimnasia y Esgrima (M). Fénix were played and defeated on 24 July in a pre-season meeting. Lautaro Rinaldi made a move in from Peruvian Primera División outfit Universidad San Martín on 25 July. Temperley ended July with Pablo Zalazar and Agustín Sosa leaving on loan to Sportivo Baradero and Talleres.

2 August saw Nicolás Muscio, Racing Club (loan), and Lucas Angelini, San Martín (B), join. The next three days allowed Temperley to schedule pre-season friendlies with upcoming league rivals Alvarado and Guillermo Brown, experiencing a win and a loss against each opponent. Cristian Paz signed for San Martín (SJ) on 8 August, a day prior to the cancellation of Temperley's friendly with Villa San Carlos.

August
Temperley got their Primera B Nacional campaign going on 16 August, falling to a three-goal defeat away to newly promoted Estudiantes (RC). They gained a point on matchday two versus Nueva Chicago on 24 August, as Lautaro Rinaldi netted on his home debut.

September
On 1 September, Temperley gained their first competitive victory of the season after beating Guillermo Brown one-nil away from home. 4 September saw them face Banfield's reserves for the second time in 2019–20, as they responded to July's loss with a 3–0 win. Temperley returned to league action against Alvarado on 7 September, drawing 0–0. They faced Belgrano five days later, losing 3–1.

Squad

Transfers
Domestic transfer windows:3 July 2019 to 24 September 201920 January 2020 to 19 February 2020.

Transfers in

Transfers out

Loans in

Loans out

Friendlies

Pre-season
Temperley began their pre-season in mid-May, just two months after the conclusion of 2018–19. They met Independiente and Racing Club Reserves that month, prior to facing Gimnasia y Esgrima (LP) Reserves and Gimnasia y Esgrima (LP) (first-team) in June. July saw Temperley set friendlies with Independiente, Aldosivi, Sportivo Italiano, Estudiantes (LP), Comunicaciones, Banfield Reserves, Independiente and Fénix. Their final encounters were scheduled for August with Alvarado, Guillermo Brown and Villa San Carlos.

Mid-season
Temperley again met the reserves of Banfield for a friendly fixture in early September.

Competitions

Primera B Nacional

Results summary

Matches
The fixtures for the 2019–20 league season were announced on 1 August 2019, with a new format of split zones being introduced. Temperley were drawn in Zone A.

Squad statistics

Appearances and goals

Statistics accurate as of 14 September 2019.

Goalscorers

Notes

References

Club Atlético Temperley seasons
Temperley